"Make Ya Feel Beautiful" is the second single from Ruben Studdard's third album The Return. It has reached a peak of number 32 on Billboard's Hot R&B/Hip Hop Singles chart. In addition, the single has reached a peak at number six on the Hot Adult R&B Airplay chart.

Charts

Weekly charts

Year-end charts

References

2006 songs
2007 singles
Ruben Studdard songs
J Records singles
Songs written by Ne-Yo
Songs written by Shea Taylor